Parmouti 4 - Coptic Calendar - Parmouti 6

The fifth day of the Coptic month of Parmouti, the eighth month of the Coptic year. In common years, this day corresponds to March 31, of the Julian Calendar, and April 13, of the Gregorian Calendar. This day falls in the Coptic Season of Shemu, the season of the Harvest.

Commemorations

Prophets 

 The martyrdom of the Righteous Ezekiel the Prophet, son of Buzi

Martyrs 

 The martyrdom of Saint Hepatius, Bishop of Gangara

References 

Days of the Coptic calendar